Jackson Nicolau (born 19 July 1987) was an Australian Rugby league footballer who played for the Gold Coast Titans and North Queensland Cowboys in the NRL.

He was born in the North Queensland town of Innisfail. He primarily plays in the five eighth position and played for Brisbane's Norths Devils in the Queensland Cup in 2006. He was groomed as the replacement for Scott Hill at the storm before deciding to return home and sign with the North Queensland Cowboys.

Nicolau debuted for the Cowboys on 31 March 2007 coming off the bench against the St George Illawarra Dragons.

Jackson joined the Gold Coast Titans in the 2009 season. He semi retired in 2010 and begun playing for the Tugun Seahawks in the Gold Coast local comp.

Notes

External links
 Jackson Nicolau newspaper article (January 2007)
Gold Coast profile

1987 births
Living people
Australian people of Greek descent
Australian rugby league players
Lakes United Seagulls players
North Queensland Cowboys players
Norths Devils players
Rugby league five-eighths
Rugby league players from Innisfail, Queensland